The 1906 Argentine Primera División was the 15th season of top-flight football in Argentina. The 1906 championship was expanded to include 11 teams. The teams were split into two groups with each team playing the others in their group twice. The two group winners played in a championship decider.

The season began on April 29 and ended on October 7. San Isidro, Argentino de Quilmes and San Martín A.C. (from the homonymous city) made their debuts in Primera. Belgrano A.C. also registered a "B" team (named "Belgrano Extra") to play the tournament. Alumni regaining the Argentine championship for the 6th time in seven seasons.

Final tables

Group A

Group B

Championship final

Matchd details

References

Argentine Primera División seasons
1906 in Argentine football
1906 in South American football
1906 in South American football leagues
p